Wykked Wytch is an American black metal band signed to Perish Music Group from Philadelphia, Pennsylvania, United States.

Biography
The band released its first album, Something Wykked This Way Comes, in 1996 on its own label, Cauldron Records. Demolition Records, a UK-based metal label, re-issued the album with two additional tracks for European distribution.

Work began on a second album in 1999. Angelic Vengeance was recorded at Damage Studios in Italy and released in 2001. 

They recorded demos for a third album, Nefret, in 2002 at Audiohammer Studios in Florida with engineer Jason Suecof and session drummer Richard Christy. The album was recorded in 2003 at Studio 13 in Florida and released in 2004 by Demolition/Dreamcatcher Records with cover art by Chad Michael Ward, who had designed the cover for Angelic Vengeance.

They toured with Carpathian Forest and the No Mercy festivals in 2005, then returned home and began work on a fourth album, recording three demos before leaving on tour with Deicide in October.

They signed with UK label SixSixSix Records in 2006 but soon left. Their self-financed fourth album, Memories of a Dying Whore, was recorded at Redroom Recorders in Tampa, Florida and released in 2007 by Perish Music. Before the completion of the album, Wykked Wytch would join Hanzel and Gretyl and Bella Morte for a short US tour "Oktotenfest" in the Fall of 2006.

In 2008, the band released two cover songs and videos; the songs were "Sweet Dreams" from Eurythmics and "Bring Me to Life" from Evanescence.

In 2012, they released their album The Ultimate Deception, and toured the United States as an opening act for Soulfly. In the middle of that year, the band went on indefinite hiatus, on which they remain.

Members

Current line-up
Ipek Warnock - Vocals
Nate Poulson - Guitar, bass, programming
Salvatore LoPresti - Keyboards

Former members
Mark Warlokk - Guitar
Gio Geraca - Guitar
Sean Young - Guitar
Kenny B - Bass
Jeremy Deacon - Bass
Sean Tibbetts - Bass
David - Bass, guitar
Barry Meyers - Bass
Pat Aylward - Bass
Ben Kuzay - Bass 
Tomb Radley - Bass
Steve Brubaker - Drums
Harry Ketterer - Drums
Cj Tollis - Drums
John Rae - Drums
Koos - Drums
Chris Morini - Drums
Richard Christy - Drums
Lenny Warmbrandt - Bass

Discography
Demos
 Nefret (2002)
 Awakened (2006)

Albums
 Something Wykked This Way Comes (1996) (Re-release in (2000) with extra two tracks)
 Angelic Vengeance (2001)
 Nefret (2004)
 Memories of a Dying Whore (2008)
 The Ultimate Deception (2012)

Videos
 "The Soul Awaits" (2004)
 "Sweet Dreams" (2008) (Eurythmics Cover)
 "Awakened" (2008)
 "Bring Me to Life" (2008) (Evanescence Cover)

Promo Videos
 2008: Making the Video Sweet Dreams
 2008: Promo Trailer Sweet Dreams

References

External links
 All Music Guide profile
 Official website
 Official MySpace

American black metal musical groups
Musical groups established in 1994
Musical groups from Miami
Musical groups from Philadelphia
Heavy metal musical groups from Pennsylvania